Mitsumasa (written: 光政, 光正 or 光雅) is a masculine Japanese given name. Notable people with the name include:

 (born 1926), Japanese writer and illustrator
 (1609–1682), Japanese daimyō
 (born 1977), Japanese footballer
 (1880–1948), Japanese admiral, politician and Prime Minister of Japan

Japanese masculine given names